The 2017 Jerez GP3 Series round was the penultimate round of the 2017 GP3 Series. It was held on 7 and 8 October 2017 at Circuito de Jerez in Jerez de la Frontera, Spain. The race supported the 2017 Jerez Formula 2 round.

Classification

Qualifying

Feature Race

Sprint Race

Championship standings after the round

Drivers' Championship standings

Teams' Championship standings

 Note: Only the top five positions are included for both sets of standings.

Notes

References

|- style="text-align:center"
|width="35%"|Previous race:
|width="30%"|GP3 Series2017 season
|width="40%"|Next race:

Jerez
GP3
GP3 Jerez